David II (died 993) was a Georgian prince of the Bagratid dynasty of Tao-Klarjeti and ruler of Klarjeti from 988 until his death.

David II was a son of Sumbat II, whom he succeeded as prince of Klarjeti. Virtually nothing is known about his life. He died without issue, being succeeded by his nephew Sumbat III.

References

993 deaths
Grand dukes of Klarjeti
10th-century rulers in Asia
Year of birth unknown
Bagrationi dynasty of Klarjeti